Flavivirga aquimarina is a Gram-negative, aerobic, non-spore-forming and rod-shaped bacterium from the genus of Flavivirga which has been isolated from the seaweed Ecklonia cava.

References 

Flavobacteria
Bacteria described in 2017